Schedules Direct is a non-profit organization that provides a low-cost television program listing service for open source and freeware digital video recorders.

Developers from several different projects including MythTV, XMLTV, and GB-PVR founded Schedules Direct in response to Tribune Media Services's (TMS's) decision to shut down its free Data Direct program listing service as of September 1, 2007. MythTV and other such software use the data to display an on-screen electronic program guide (EPG), and to schedule upcoming recordings. Schedules Direct contracts with TMS to purchase a license to redistribute its data—which TiVo and other commercial digital video recorders also use—to Schedules Direct members.  Individuals may become Schedules Direct members for $25 a year, and members may use the listings service with approved open source and freeware applications.

References

External links
 Schedules Direct website

Television technology